Crab Run is a stream located entirely within Ritchie County, West Virginia. It is a tributary of South Fork Hughes River.

Crab Run was descriptively named on account of crayfish in its waters.

See also
List of rivers of West Virginia

References

Rivers of Ritchie County, West Virginia
Rivers of West Virginia